Galbi, galbi-gui, or grilled ribs, is a type of gui (grilled dish) in Korean cuisine. "Galbi" is the Korean word for "rib", and the dish is usually made with beef short ribs. When pork spare ribs or another meat is used instead, the dish is named accordingly. Galbi is served raw, then cooked on tabletop grills usually by the diners themselves. The dish may be marinated in a sweet and savory sauce usually containing soy sauce, garlic, and sugar. Both non-marinated and marinated galbi are often featured in Korean barbecue. This and many other dishes in Korean barbecue influenced Yakiniku as seen in the use of galbi (coined as karubi).

Preparation

Cuts and marination 

Traditionally, galbi is cut to expose one smooth bone along the short edge with the meat uniformly filleted in flat layers.

An alternative cut, "LA galbi", also known as a flanken cut, features cut bones peeking out along the long edge. The method was developed by Korean immigrants in Los Angeles to accommodate the thinner rib-eye cut preferred by American butchers. The variation, which enables the marinade to penetrate the meat faster, has since made its way back to South Korea. Non-marinated galbi is called saeng-galbi ("fresh ribs"); marinated galbi is referred to as yangnyeom-galbi ("seasoned ribs"). Pork galbi is usually served marinated, but non-marinated dwaeji-saeng-galbi ("fresh pork ribs"), made of Jeju Black pig, is popular in Jeju Island. As pork ribs are smaller, marinated dwaeji-galbi often consists of pork ribs mixed with shoulder meats.

Beef 
Softer cuts of beef, such as from a cow or heifer, are preferred when grilling galbi. Properly grilled, the dish is a glossy, dark-reddish brown with a smoky, sweet taste. The meat should easily fall from the bones.  

The marinade for so-galbi-gui ("grilled beef ribs") typically includes soy sauce, sugar, minced garlic and scallions, ginger juice, ground black pepper, toasted and ground sesame, and sesame oil. The beef is usually scored on the surface prior to marinating, and the juice from Korean pears is brushed on before grilling.

Pork 
For dwaeji-galbi-gui ("grilled pork ribs"), the marinade can be either ganjang (soy sauce)-based or gochujang (chili paste)-based: the former being similar to beef galbi marinade and the latter being spicy. Cheongju (rice wine) is usually used in both types of marinade to remove any undesired porky smell.

Deeper cuts are made when scoring the surface to allow the marinade to penetrate the meat.

Grilling and serving 
Galbi is grilled, typically by the diners themselves, on grills set in the tables. The meat cooks for a short time on medium high heat on a lightly greased gridiron over glowing charcoal. The remaining marinade is brushed on during grilling to produce a glazed finish. 

Once cooked, the meat is typically cut into pieces over the grill with kitchen scissors, then wrapped inside lettuce leaves, kkaennip (perilla leaves), or other leafy vegetables. These made-on-the-spot leaf wraps, called ssam, usually include a piece of grilled meat, ssamjang, raw or grilled garlic, and a sauce made of soybean paste and chili paste. Like other Korean main dishes, galbi is often accompanied by bap (cooked rice) and side dishes known as banchan.

See also 
 Korean cuisine
 Bulgogi – barbequed beef or pork
 Dak-galbi – spicy stir-fried chicken
 Galbi-jjim – braised short ribs
 Galbi-tang – short rib soup
 Korean barbecue
 Samgyeopsal – grilled pork belly
 Tteok-galbi – grilled short rib patties
 Yakiniku – a similar Japanese dish
 Asado

References

External links 

Barbecue
Korean beef dishes
Korean pork dishes
Table-cooked dishes